Rhee In-je (hangul: 이인제; born 11 December 1948), a former judge, is a South Korean politician.

Political career
He was born in Nonsan, South Chungcheong Province and graduated from Seoul National University. In 1988, he entered politics after having been elected to the National Assembly. He also served as the first Minister of Labor in President Kim Young-sam’s administration in 1993, and the governor of Gyeonggi Province from 1995–1997.

In the 1997, he was defeated by Lee Hoi-chang in the New Korea Party's election to choose its presidential candidate. Afterwards, he resigned from the party to create the New People's Party to launch his ultimately unsuccessful run for the presidency. In the 2002, he was one of the leading contenders to run for president as the nominee of the Millennium Democratic Party but resigned after being defeated by the ultimate presidential victor Roh Moo-hyun. In 2007, Rhee again ran for president as the nominee of the Democratic Party but was defeated by Grand National Party candidate Lee Myung-bak. He has stayed active in politics and in July 2014 was elected to the Supreme Council of Saenuri Party, then ruling party of the Republic of Korea. He has a special nickname: Phoenikje [a combination of Phoenix and (Rhee in) JE]. The nickname derives from his ability to change political party affiliation 16 times and be elected to the National Assembly a total of six times despite numerous past defeats in presidential elections and the fall of his affiliated parties. He ran for governor of South Chungcheong Province in the 2018 local elections but lost to Yang Seung-jo of the Democratic Party of Korea.

References

External links
 Official website

South Korean politicians
Seoul National University alumni
1948 births
Living people
People from Nonsan
South Korean judges
Kyungbock High School alumni
Jeonju Yi clan
Labor ministers of South Korea
Governors of Gyeonggi Province